Blue Thunder is a monster truck that races in the USHRA Monster Jam series. It was originally sponsored by the truck division of Ford Motor Company and Live Nation.  The truck has several similarities with the monster truck Bigfoot. Some fans saw Blue Thunder as a replacement for Bigfoot in the Monster Jam series. The truck has been moderately successful and won several major events during its existence. However, it has not yet won a championship. Blue Thunder was used by Ford Motor Company for promotional purposes along with competition. The truck is currently driven by Todd LeDuc. The truck did not compete in 2012 when Todd LeDuc moved to Metal Mulisha after driving Blue Thunder in 2011, but as of 2022, he began driving Blue Thunder again due to the Monster Energy truck not operating anymore. With Ford dropping its sponsorship in 2012, the truck was redesigned and brought back in 2013 with veteran driver Dan Evans; former owner/driver of the Destroyer monster truck.

Truck history

Ford Motor Company teamed up with Live Nation to create a monster truck that would highlight its "Ford Tough" campaign. The body style would be based on the F series Ford pickup with the body style being changed with each model year. Patrick Chassis was chosen to construct the chassis for Blue Thunder. The drive line consists of a Merlin 540ci blown & injected engine with a Dedenbear two speed automatic transmission. This setup has caused some controversy, as Merlin engines are based on the Big Block Chevrolet.  The tires on Blue Thunder are 66" Goodyear Terra Tires. Construction of two trucks with the "Blue Thunder" name were completed. The debut of Blue Thunder was January 6, 2001, at the Houston Astrodome in Houston, Texas. Since its debut, it has placed in the finals every year. It performs at more than 20 events per year and is displayed at various promotional events. It also has been licensed for various toys and for several video games.

Drivers

Current Drivers 
 Chelsea VanCleave (2023-present)

Former Drivers 
 George Balhan (2003-05)
 Tony Farrell (2002-2009, deceased)
 Lee O'Donnell (on one occasion in 2008)
 Dan Rodoni (one Event in Canada in 2014)
 Dalton Millican (2015, deceased)
 Lyle Hancock (2001-2003)
 Norm Miller (2005-07)
 Bobby Zoellner
 Linsey Weenk (2008-10)
 Frank Krmel (2009-10)
 Dan Evans (2013-14)
 Pablo Huffaker (World Finals 14)
 Tyler Menninga (2016)
 Alx Danielsson (2017)
 Rhianna Buchanan (2017)
 Matt Cody (2017-2020)
 Todd LeDuc (2011,2022-2023)
When the Blue Thunder debuted in 2001, Lyle Hancock was the primary driver. Through the years, Norm Miller, Bobby Zoellner, George Balhan and Tony Farrell have also been drivers. In July 2007, it was announced that Linsey Weenk of CSK Motorsports joined Live Nation Motorsports to drive Blue Thunder. He debuted at Monsters on Mainstreet in Kankakee, IL Speedway. In 2011 after ford left FELD motorsports, Todd LeDuc was announced the new driver where he would drive it for one season and win a SPEED TV event, but has returned again as of 2022, due to his previous truck, Monster Energy, discontinued in November 2021. After taking a year off it was brought back with veteran driver Dan Evans behind the wheel. The current driver was Dalton Millican competing in the #MoreMonsterJam tour with 7 other drivers in arenas across the country. 
Dalton Millican died on August 12, 2015 of a single-vehicle motorcycle crash at age 22.

Awards

Monster Jam World Finals

 2001
Driver: Lyle Hancock
 Racing: Lost to Goldberg in the Finals
Freestyle: N/A

 2002

Driver: Lyle Hancock
Racing: N/A *Broke after intros.*
Freestyle: Scored 35 - Tied for Third

 2003

Driver: Lyle Hancock
Racing: Lost to Madusa in Round 1
Freestyle: Scored 34 - Third

 2004

Driver: Tony Farrell
Racing: Lost to Blacksmith in Round 2
Freestyle: Scored 9 - Three Way Tie Last

 2005

Driver: Tony Farrell
Racing: Lost to Bounty Hunter in Quarter-Finals
Freestyle: Scored 31 Tied First Place With Bounty Hunter. Scored 36, Second Place,  In  Tie breaker

2006

Driver: Tony Farrell
Racing: Lost to Taz in Round 2
Freestyle: Scored 24 - Sixth

2007

Driver: Tony Farrell
Racing: Lost to Monster Mutt Round 2
Freestyle: Scored 21 - Three way tie Tenth

2008

Driver: Linsey Weenk
Racing: Lost to Bounty Hunter in Round 2
Freestyle: Scored 30 - Tied Grave Digger for fourth

2009

Driver: Linsey Weenk
Racing: Lost to Captain's Curse in Semi-Finals
Freestyle: Scored 28 - Fourth

2010

Driver: Linsey Weenk
Racing: Lost to Maximum Destruction in Semi-Finals
Freestyle: Scored 25 - Tied Iron Man and Avenger for fifth

2013

Driver: Pablo Huffaker
Racing: Lost To Grave Digger The Legend In Round 3 
Freestyle: Scored 30 - Second

2022
Driver: Todd Leduc
Racing: Lost To Black Pearl In Round 2
2 Wheel Skills Scored 6.321 - Sixth
 High jump 32.732 - Seventh
Freestyle: Scored 7.981 - Sixth

Similar Trucks

There was also an earlier monster truck under the same name campaigned by Kevin Dabney and Kirk Dabney which had a Camaro body and raced in the 1980s. The two vehicles are unrelated although the name of the current truck may have been derived from the earlier vehicle.

See also
 Monster Truck
 List of Monster Trucks

References

External links
 Monster Truck Online

Monster trucks
Off-road vehicles
Sports entertainment
Vehicles introduced in 2001
Vehicles introduced in 2013